The 1885 general election in Ireland was the first election following the Representation of the People Act 1884 and the Redistribution of Seats Act 1885, which redrew the Irish electoral landscape.

The election saw the Irish Parliamentary Party secure their place as the dominant party in Irish politics, winning the vast majority of available seats. In comparison, the Liberals were wiped out in Ireland, whilst the Conservatives were reduced to 16 seats.

The election also saw the emergence of the Irish Loyal and Patriotic Union; one of the forerunners of the later Irish Unionist Alliance. The IPLU sought to maximise the number of candidates elected from unionist parties in the three southern Irish provinces. In doing this the party would support individual candidates in various constituencies, and encourage Irish unionists to vote for these candidates, instead of splitting their vote between the various parties. Despite the IPLU's attempts, no southern Unionists were elected.

The election also saw a similarly named Loyal Irish Union, which campaigned alongside Irish Conservatives. Unlike the ILPU, which prioritised Unionism over party politics, the Loyal Irish Union prioritised opposition to the Liberals over forming any kind of bi-partisan Unionist alliance.

Changes to the Irish Electorate
The Irish electorate in 1885 was radically different to that in 1880. The Representation of the People Act 1884 equalised the county and borough franchises and made all householders and lodgers in the counties eligible to vote, thereby bringing Irish electoral law into line with that in Great Britain. The result of this reform was massive, and saw the Irish electorate more than triple, increasing from 229,204 in 1880 to 737,965 in 1885. In spite of this, however, the Irish electorate was still comparatively smaller than the electorates of the other nations of the United Kingdom; whilst 2 in 3 adults males had the vote in England and Wales, or 3 in 5 in Scotland, in Ireland only 1 in 2 adult males could vote.

Results
Not included in the totals are the two Dublin University seats, which were uncontested and were retained by the Conservatives.

See also
 History of Ireland (1801–1923)

References

1885
Ireland
1885 elections in Ireland